Václav Krška (7 October 1900 – 17 November 1969) was a Czech film director, screenwriter and writer.

Life
Krška was born in Písek on 7 October 1900 as the only child. His father was a butcher and innkeeper, but died soon after his birth. His mother married a mill owner, so Krška grew up in a mill in Heřmaň. After his step-father and mother died, he was managing the mill until 1937. In his youth he founded an amateur theatre for which he wrote, acted and directed. He also wrote poems, short stories and novels. Krška made his first movie Fiery Summer in 1939, based on the novel he wrote. He was a homosexual, as were his frequent collaborators František Čáp and Eduard Cupák. During the Nazi occupation he was sentenced to 5 months in prison for homosexual relations.

Selected filmography

 Fiery Summer (1939)
 The Boys on the River (1944)
 Magical River (1945)
 When You Return (1947)
 Bohemian Rapture (1947)
 The 1848 Revolutionary Year (1949)
 The Herald of Dawn (1950)
 Mikoláš Aleš (1951)
 Youthful Years (1952)
 Moon over the River (1953)
 Silvery Wind (1954)
 From My Life (1955)
 Dalibor (1956)
 Labakan (1956)
 A Legend about Love (1956)
 The Road Back (1958)
 Scars of the Past (1958)
 Young Shoots (1960)
 The Day the Trees Will Bloom (1961)
 The Comedy with Mr Klika (1964)
 A Place in the Group (segment Optimist) (1964)
 The Last Rose from Casanova (1966)
 The Girl with Three Camels (1967)
 Spring Waters (1968)

References

External links

1900 births
1969 deaths
Czech film directors
Czech screenwriters
Czechoslovak film directors
LGBT film directors
Gay screenwriters
Czech gay writers
Czech LGBT screenwriters
Czech LGBT novelists
Czech LGBT dramatists and playwrights
Czech male novelists
Czech male dramatists and playwrights
People from Písek
20th-century screenwriters
20th-century Czech LGBT people